University College Opera, or UCOpera, is the student opera company of University College London. The operas are staged by professional singers, directors and designers, with the orchestra and chorus drawn from the student body. Founded in 1951, UCOpera is known for its productions of rarely performed operas, including 3 world premières, and 22 British premières.  On 10 March 2008 UCOpera staged the UK premiere of Édouard Lalo's Fiesque, at the Bloomsbury Theatre. 2009 saw another British première, Ernest Bloch's Macbeth. UCOpera extended its list of British premières by staging Gounod's Polyeucte at Theatre Royal Stratford East in 2018, and Smetana's Czech national opera, Libuše in 2019.

History
The brainchild of the conductor Anthony Addison, (UCL's then Director of Music), University College Opera gave its first performance in 1951 with an all-student production of Purcell's Dido and Aeneas, followed by Mozart's Bastien und Bastienne. Even in its earliest years, the company's annual repertoire concentrated on rarely performed operas including: Nicolai's The Merry Wives of Windsor (1952), Bizet's Don Procopio (1955) and Lortzing's Der Wildschütz (1958). In 1961, the company staged its first UK premiere, Moniuszko's Halka.

During its first 17 years, UCOpera's performances took place in the old gymnasium at University College. With the opening of the college's Bloomsbury Theatre in 1968, the company finally acquired a suitable venue for its productions. Under the directorship of George Badacsonyi who served from 1963 to 1976, UCOpera increasingly employed professional opera singers (often in the early stages of their careers) to sing the solo roles, with students making up the chorus and orchestra. Amongst the professional singers who have appeared with the company are Felicity Lott (who is now the patron of Friends of UCOpera), Robert Lloyd, Jonathan Summers, and Julian Gavin. The company's productions also became more ambitious with a series of UK and world premieres including: Wagner's Das Liebesverbot (1965); Haydn's Die Feuersbrunst (1966); Erkel's Bánk bán (1968); and Verdi's Alzira (1970).

A highlight for the company under the directorship of David Drummond (who served from 1992 to 2001) was UCOpera's world premiere staging of César Franck's Hulda in its complete form. The 1994 production used a score which Drummond restored from the composer's original manuscript. Drummond's last performance as the company's Director coincided with its 50th anniversary, the 2001 UK premiere of Aulis Sallinen's Kullervo.

Under the directorship of Charles Peebles UCOpera has produced British premieres of Hahn's  Ciboulette, Dvořák's Vanda, Lalo's Fiesque, Gounod's Polyeucte and Smetana's Libuše. In 2012 UCOpera produced the first staging of Rameau's Acante et Céphise since the 18th century. After staging at least one opera a year for 69 years, the continuity was broken in 2020, as the production of Haydn's L'anima del filosofo was cancelled due to the COVID-19 pandemic.

Productions since 2001

(* denotes British premières)

Productions 1951 to 2000

(* denotes British premières)

(** denotes world premières)

References
Notes

Sources
Christiansen, Rupert, "South Seas romp for desert island Dick" (review of Offenbach's Whittington), The Daily Telegraph, 26 March 2005. Retrieved 8 March 2008.
Elleson, Ruth, "Bloch's Macbeth" (review), Opera Today, 30 March 2009.
Hall, George "Fiesque" (review), The Guardian, 12 March 2008. Retrieved 13 March 2008.
Kimberley, Nick, "Epic on a human scale" (review of Sallinen's Kullervo), The Independent, 29 March 2001. Retrieved 8 March 2008.
Maycock, Robert, "Out of the top drawer" (review of Franck's Hulda), The Independent, 24 March 1994
Maycock, Robert, "Classical Music", The Independent, 24 March 1995
University College Opera, Company history (official website)

External links
 University College Opera official website
 The Bloomsbury Theatre, the main venue for UCOpera performances
 UCOpera Photo Gallery

British opera companies
Opera in London
Opera
University musical groups in the United Kingdom
Performing groups established in 1951
1951 establishments in England